Thea Christiansen Foss (8 June 1857 – 7 June 1927) was the founder of Foss Maritime, the largest tugboat company in the western United States. She was the real-life person on which the fictional character "Tugboat Annie" (originally portrayed on film in 1933 by Marie Dressler) may have been very loosely based.

Biography

Thea Christiansen came to the United States from Eidsberg, Østfold, Norway and married Norwegian immigrant Andrew Foss in Minneapolis, Minnesota in 1881.

Thea Foss launched the future tugboat firm on the Tacoma waterfront in the summer of 1889. She started the Foss Launch Company, which eventually became the Seattle-based Foss Maritime Company.

Thea Foss died in Tacoma on the day before her 70th birthday.

Legacy
The Thea Foss Waterway, a 1.5-mile (2.4-kilometre) mile inlet in Tacoma's industrial area, and connected to Puget Sound, is named after Foss.
, which had served as a patrol vessel in World War II, was renamed the Thea Foss after being purchased by Foss Marine Company.
The power yacht now known as Mitlite was originally launched in 1933 as the Thea Foss; it appears to have been the only yacht ever built by Foss Tug. During World War II, it was conscripted by the U.S. Navy for use as a Barrage Balloon Tender, J2036.
Thea Foss Lodge of the Daughters of Norway was instituted on 29 May 2004. Lodge #45 meets in Chimacum, Washington.
Foss Peak, a 6524-foot mountain summit in the Tatoosh Range of Mount Rainier National Park
 In 1989, Thea Foss was inducted into the Washington State Centennial Hall of Honor.

References

Other sources
Skalley, Michael  Foss: Ninety years of towboating  (1981)

External links
Foss Maritime Official Website
So Many Things To Do Yet: The Saga of Thea Foss
Thea Foss Lodge #45, Daughters of Norway
Foss Waterway Development Authority

 

1857 births
1927 deaths
19th-century American businesspeople
People from Eidsberg
Norwegian emigrants to the United States
Businesspeople from Tacoma, Washington
American women company founders
20th-century American businesspeople
American transportation businesspeople
20th-century American businesswomen
19th-century American businesswomen